Hoover Dam, in Blendon Township, near Westerville, Ohio, dams the Big Walnut Creek to form the Hoover Memorial Reservoir. This reservoir is a major water source for the city of Columbus, Ohio. Construction began during 1953 due to the increased water demand of post-war Columbus. The project was completed and dedicated in 1955 and the dam officially opened in 1958. It was named for two brothers, Charles P. Hoover and Clarence B. Hoover, to honor their careers with the City of Columbus Waterworks.

Construction statistics 

 Quantity of concrete: approximately 
 Quantity of earth fill: approximately 
 Length of spillway: 
 Length of dam: 
 Uncontrolled spillway elevation:  mean sea level
 Top of dam elevation:  mean sea level

Gallery

References

External links

  Kayak Hoover Dam - a semi-informative treatise on the wonders of kayaking at the Central Ohio Reservoir, complete with pictures and interactive maps leading to boat ramps.
 GoFishOhio.com - information about fishing at Hoover Reservoir
Ohio DNR fishing map of Hoover Reservoir

Dams in Ohio
Buildings and structures in Franklin County, Ohio
Westerville, Ohio
Dams completed in 1955
1955 establishments in Ohio